Villy Bækgaard Andersen (born 28 March 1938) is a Danish boxer. He competed in the men's flyweight event at the 1960 Summer Olympics.

References

1938 births
Living people
Danish male boxers
Olympic boxers of Denmark
Boxers at the 1960 Summer Olympics
Sportspeople from Aarhus
Flyweight boxers